Syllepte sellalis is a moth in the family Crambidae. It was described by Achille Guenée in 1854. It is found in Bangladesh and India.

It has a wingspan of 41-43mm.

References

Moths described in 1854
sellalis
Moths of Asia